The Zaporizhzhia Nuclear Power Station in southeastern Ukraine is the largest nuclear power plant in Europe and among the 10 largest in the world. It is under the control of Russia since 2022. It was built by the Soviet Union near the city of Enerhodar, on the southern shore of the Kakhovka Reservoir on the Dnieper river. It is operated by Energoatom, who also operate Ukraine's other three nuclear power stations.

The plant has six VVER-1000 pressurized light water nuclear reactors (PWR), each fuelled with U (LEU) and generating 950 MWe, for a total power output of 5,700 MWe. The first five were successively brought online between 1985 and 1989, and the sixth was added in 1995. The plant generates nearly half of the country's electricity derived from nuclear power, and more than a fifth of total electricity generated in Ukraine. The Zaporizhzhia thermal power station is nearby.

On 4 March 2022, the nuclear and thermal power stations were both captured by Russian forces during the Battle of Enerhodar of the 2022 Russian invasion of Ukraine.  the plant is reportedly controlled by the Russian company Rosatom. The plant continued to be operated by Ukrainian staff, under Russian control, until 11 September 2022, when the sixth reactor was disconnected.

Facilities 

The spent nuclear fuel is stored in cooling pools inside the reactor containments for up to five years. It is then transferred to an on-site dry cask storage facility that was commissioned in 2004. The reactors and spent fuel pools depend on water from the Kakhovka Reservoir for cooling. The reservoir is created by the Kakhovka Hydroelectric Power Plant dam, which is a main conflict location of the two war participants.

The electricity generated is supplied to the Ukrainian grid through four 750kV overhead transmission lines and one 330kV line. One of the 750kV lines runs northwards across the Kakhovka Reservoir and on to the Dniprovska substation just south of Vilnohirsk in Dnipropetrovsk Oblast. The other three 750kV lines run south from the plant, first splitting off at the village of Zapovitne to the Kakhovska substation just west of Nova Kakhovka. This is the newest of the lines and was commissioned in 2021. Two lines continue south-southeast, splitting off at the urban-type settlement of Mykhailivka with one line continuing southeast to the Pivdennodonbaska mines in Donetsk Oblast, and the other continuing east and then north to the Zaporizka substation north of Znackove in Zaporizhzhia Oblast. The 330kV line runs to the neighbouring Zaporizhzhia thermal power station.

In 2017, modernization work was completed on reactor unit 3, enabling a 10-year life extension to 2027. In 2021, modernization work was completed on unit 5, enabling a 10-year life extension.

Incidents

1984 electrical fire 
On 27 January 1984, a major fire started during commissioning of unit 1, before any nuclear fuel was in the reactor. An electrical relay caused PVC insulation to catch fire, molten PVC causing more fires below in a vertical shaft. More than 4,000 control units, 41 motors, and 700 km of cables were damaged.

2014 intrusion attempt by insurgents  

In May 2014, 40 armed persons claiming to be representatives of Right Sector allegedly tried to gain access to the power plant area. The men were stopped by the Ukrainian police before entering Enerhodar.

The Zaporizhzhia power plant is located around 200 km from the War in Donbas combat zone, where fighting became intense in 2014. On 31 August 2014, a Greenpeace member, Tobias Münchmeyer, expressed concerns the plant could be hit by heavy artillery from the fighting.

On 3 December 2014, Prime Minister Arseny Yatseniuk announced the occurrence of an incident several days before at the Zaporizhzhia Nuclear Power Plant. The cause of the incident was reported as a short circuit in the power outlet system and was not linked to the site's production. One of the six reactors of the plant was shut down twice in December 2014. This and lack of coal for Ukraine's coal-fired power stations led to rolling blackouts throughout the country from early until late December 2014.

2022 Russian capture 

After the Russian invasion of Ukraine began on 24 February 2022, Energoatom shut down Units 5 and 6 to reduce risk, keeping Units 1 to 4 in operation on 25 February.

At 11:28 pm local time on 3 March 2022, a column of 10 Russian armored vehicles and two tanks approached the power plant. Fighting commenced at 12:48am on 4 March when Ukraine forces fired anti-tank missiles. Russian forces responded with a variety of weapons, including rocket-propelled grenades. During approximately two hours of heavy combat, a fire broke out in a training facility outside the main complex, which was extinguished by 6:20am, though other sections surrounding the plant sustained damage. The fire did not impact reactor safety or any essential equipment. The plant lost 1.3 GW of capacity. It was later learned that a large caliber bullet pierced an outer wall of Reactor No. 4 and an artillery shell hit a transformer at Reactor No. 6.

Ukrayinska Pravda reported on 12 March that the plant's management was told by Russian authorities that the plant now belonged to Rosatom, Russia's state nuclear power company. It continued to operate and supply data, including from a remote monitoring system, to the IAEA. It continued to be operated by Ukrainian staff, under Russian control.

Since July, the situation has escalated significantly, leading to an ongoing crisis. On 3 September an IAEA delegation visited the plant and on 6 September a report was published documenting damage and potential threats to plant security caused by external shelling and the presence of occupying troops in the plant.

On 11 September 2022, the final reactor was disconnected, as the plant entered cold shut down to minimize war risks caused by continued shelling.

With declared annexation of Zaporizhya oblast Russia also declared legal takeover of the plant, while the actual control over its operations continued to be unclear as of October 2022. Russian forces detained a number of plant's Ukrainian employees, starting from its deputy director Valery Martynyuk, his assistant Oleh Oshek and then IT manager Oleh Kostyukov, without providing any justification for the kidnappings.

As of November, Ukrainian cities had drawn up plans for evacuation centers, secured supplies of potassium iodide pills and 10% of emergency medicine teams in Ukraine had been reconfigured to respond to chemical, biological, radiation, and nuclear risks.

See also 

 Energy in Ukraine
 Enerhodar Dnipro Powerline Crossing
 List of power stations in Ukraine
 Nuclear power in Ukraine
 Zaporizhzhia Nuclear Power Plant crisis

References

External links 

 
 History of ZNPP 
 Information about the plant from INSC website

Buildings and structures in Zaporizhzhia Oblast
Energoatom
Nuclear power stations built in the Soviet Union
Nuclear power stations in Ukraine
Nuclear power stations using VVER reactors